Three ships of the Royal Navy have borne the name HMS Newbury:

  was a Racecourse-class minesweeper 
   was a merchant marine ship

Royal Navy ship names